Anzab-e Sofla (also Romanized as Anzāb-e Soflá; also known as Pā’īn Anzāb and Anzāb-e Pā’īn) is a village in Dowlatabad Rural District, in the Central District of Namin County, Ardabil Province, Iran. At the 2006 census, its population was 704, in 168 families.

References 

Towns and villages in Namin County